This page shows the progress of Lincoln City F.C. in the 2010–11 football season. This year they played their games in League Two in the English league system.

Results

League data

League table

Results summary

Results by round

Appearances and goals
Updated 6 May 2011.
(Substitute appearances in brackets)

Awards

Transfers

References

Lincoln City
Lincoln City F.C. seasons